Ryan Sittler (born January 28, 1974) is a former Canadian-born American professional ice hockey left winger who played in the American Hockey League (AHL). He is the son of Hockey Hall of Famer Darryl Sittler and brother of former Team USA player Meaghan Sittler. Sittler was born in London, Ontario, but grew up in Buffalo, New York.

Playing career
Sittler was drafted by the Philadelphia Flyers in the first round (7th overall) of the 1992 NHL Entry Draft. With the selection of Ryan he and his father became the first father and son selected in the top ten in the draft's history, Darryl having been selected 8th overall in 1970 By the Toronto Maple Leafs. Ryan played college hockey for the Michigan Wolverines and played on a line with Brendan Morrison during his sophomore season. He left Michigan after his sophomore season and turned pro. A series of major injuries prevented him from ever playing in the National Hockey League and eventually cut his career short at age 25.

Personal life
As of 2012 he was the Director of Youth Hockey at Palm Beach Ice Works and currently lives in Palm Beach County, Florida with his family Heather, Luke, Alec, and Bradyn.

Career statistics

Regular season and playoffs

International

References

External links

1974 births
Living people
American men's ice hockey left wingers
Baltimore Bandits players
Canadian expatriate ice hockey players in the United States
Canadian ice hockey left wingers
Charlotte Checkers (1993–2010) players
Hershey Bears players
Ice hockey people from Buffalo, New York
Ice hockey people from Ontario
Johnstown Chiefs players
Michigan Wolverines men's ice hockey players
Mobile Mysticks players
National Hockey League first-round draft picks
Philadelphia Flyers draft picks
Raleigh IceCaps players
St. John's Maple Leafs players
South Carolina Stingrays players
Sportspeople from London, Ontario